Monsters is a collection of eight science fiction  short stories by Canadian-American writer A.E. van Vogt; written during 1940 and 1950, they were assembled by Forrest J. Ackerman in 1965.

Contents
Introduction by Forrest J. Ackerman.
"Not Only Dead Men" (1942)
"Final Command" (1949)
"War of the Nerves" (1950)
"Enchanted Village" (1950)
"Concealment" (1943)
"The Sea Thing" (1940)
"The Monster" (1948)
"Vault of the Beast" (1940)

Sources
A.E van Vogt, Monsters, Publisher: Corgi, 1977, .

External links
 

1965 short story collections
Science fiction short story collections
Short story collections by A. E. van Vogt